Elisa is a Mexican telenovela produced by Irene Sabido for Televisa in 1979.

Cast 
Raquel Olmedo as Elisa
Javier Ruán
Carmen Salinas
Sergio Kleiner
María Martin
Antonio Brillas
Ana Silvia 
María Fernánda 
Mario Pintor
Mariana Garza
Elisa Eyms
Maricuca

References

External links 

Mexican telenovelas
1979 telenovelas
Televisa telenovelas
Spanish-language telenovelas
1979 Mexican television series debuts
1979 Mexican television series endings